Lirim Zendeli (born 18 October 1999 in Bochum) is a German racing driver of Macedonian-Albanian descent who is set to compete in the 2023 USF Pro 2000 Championship with TJ Speed Motorsports. He last competed as a substitute driver for Campos Racing in Formula 2. He competed in the FIA Formula 3 Championship with Charouz Racing System in 2019 as the reigning German Formula 4 champion. After the 2019 F3 season, Zendeli competed in the 2020 Toyota Racing Series in New Zealand before joining Trident for the 2020 FIA Formula 3 Championship, where he won a race at Spa. He made the step up to Formula 2 in 2021 with MP Motorsport.

Racing career

Karting 
Zendeli began his motorsport career in karting in 2010. In his home country, he finished third in the KF3 class of the ADAC Kart Masters in 2013 and won the KFJ class of the series in 2014. That year he also made the switch to European championships and competed in the CIK-FIA World Championship in the KF Junior class, among other categories. In 2015, he concluded his karting career in the KF class of the South Garda Winter Cup, where he finished 11th.

ADAC Formula 4

2016 
2016 was Zendeli's first season in single-seaters, racing in ADAC Formula 4 with ADAC Berlin-Brandenburg. He failed to score points in the opening two rounds, but after that, regularly finished in the top 10. He even achieved a podium finish with a second position in the penultimate race weekend at Zandvoort. With 74 points he finished in 13th place in the championship, whilst he ended up fifth in the rookie class.

2017 
The following year Zendeli contested a double programme in both the ADAC and Italian Formula 4 championships, again with ADAC Berlin-Brandenburg. In the German series, Zendeli took his maiden single-seater win at Oschersleben. However, his title challenge was derailed when he suffered two retirements and two non-scoring finishes in the next three rounds. Despite this, he would win again in the Nürburgring and during the penultimate race at the Hockenheimring. The German classified fourth in the standings with 164 points, he also had a further two podiums. In the Italian championship, the German scored two podium finishes, but was not included in the final standings as he did not take part in the final race weekend at Monza.

2018 

For 2018, Zendeli moved to the US Racing-CHRS team, partnering David Schumacher, Mick Wishofer and Tom Beckhäuser, for a year that would prove to be his breakout. Zendeli dominated throughout the campaign, winning four of the first six races. Amazingly, Zendeli won at every round, and this allowed him to claim the title during the penultimate round at the Nürburgring. Zendeli rounded the season with two wins. He dominated the season by taking eight pole positions of a possible 14, winning 10 races out of 21 and finishing over 100 points ahead of nearest rival Liam Lawson.

FIA Formula 3 Championship

2019 
Zendeli progressed to Formula 3 in 2019, continuing with Charouz and alongside Fabio Scherer and Raoul Hyman. Zendeli's only points came at the Red Bull Ring, finishing eighth and seventh place. In the latter result, Zendeli had started on reverse pole but lost out to the faster cars. He was set for another strong result in Monza, but suffered a puncture while battling for the lead. He missed the final round, and ended 18th in the championship with six points.

Following the season, Zendeli made a one-off appearance in the 2019 Formula Regional European Championship. He claimed two second places and ended 14th in the standings.

2020 
During 2020 pre-season, he competed in the Toyota Racing Series with Giles Motorsport. Zendeli took four podiums but no wins, and managed to end up eighth in the standings.

In Formula 3, Zendeli signed for Trident Racing to partner David Beckmann and Olli Caldwell in the 2020 season. Zendeli managed to qualify second in his first race at the Red Bull Ring, but dropped to fifth at the flag despite momentarily being in the lead, and followed it up with fifth in Race 2. He scored his first Formula 3 podium finish at the rain-shortened first race of the second Red Bull Ring round. The German made a brilliant start from sixth, soaring to second on the first lap and nearly snatching the lead from the Frederik Vesti. He remained in the position until the conclusion of the race. The next two rounds went poorly for Zendeli, starting at the Hungaroring where he suffered collision damage in Race 1 and had to retire, with 16th place in the following race. In Silverstone, he had no pace and did not score. During the second Silverstone round in Race 2, Zendeli lined up on reverse pole and led for most of the race. On the final lap, he battled with Bent Viscaal and the Dutchman won out, and eventually Zendeli crossed the finish line second, only 0.189 seconds behind Viscaal.

After a scoreless weekend in Barcelona, Zendeli took his first Formula 3 pole position at Spa-Francorchamps. He led every lap to take his first victory by four seconds. He ended Race 2 in eighth place. In Monza, Zendeli qualified second but was given a ten-place grid penalty for dangerous offences. After a quiet Race 1 in eighth, he had a wild Race 2, taking the lead early but made a mistake and fell to seventh. He eventually worked his way to finish in fourth. He took a second pole position at the season finale at Mugello. He remained in the lead for seven laps and later fought with Jake Hughes but Zendeli would fall to fourth place at the finish. Race 2 ended in disappointment as he was eliminated on the opening lap after colliding with Logan Sargeant. Zendeli ended the season eighth in the championship with 104 points with one win, two poles and two podiums – behind Beckmann but considerably ahead of Caldwell – and helped his Trident team to achieve second place in the teams' championship.

2022 
Zendeli returned to Charouz Racing System for a cameo appearance for the 2022 Barcelona Formula 3 round, taking over David Schumacher's seat. Starting 22nd, in both races, Zendeli managed to progress up in both races, taking 20th and 15th in the sprint and feature races respectively. Zendeli was replaced by Zdeněk Chovanec for the Silverstone onwards. The German was ranked 31st in the standings.

FIA Formula 2 Championship

2021 
In December 2020 it was announced that Zendeli would graduate to the FIA Formula 2 Championship for the  season, driving for MP Motorsport alongside Richard Verschoor. He scored his first points in his first race at Bahrain, thanks to a fastest lap by finishing ninth. That saw him line up for Sprint Race 2, and he was set for points when Christian Lundgaard made contact with his rear-right tyre, causing the German a puncture and his retirement. In Monaco, Zendeli qualified in 17th, and in the second sprint race he would finish in seventh, scoring points due to others' misfortune. In Baku, Zendeli had another incident in the second sprint but rescued a point with tenth in the feature race. Silverstone would be successful, as he finished close to the points in the first two races, before claiming ninth in the feature race. In Monza, Zendeli was on for a huge result in sprint race 1, but his race ended in the dying laps due to a engine issue. In the feature race, he had a strong race, climbing his way to his joint-best seventh place. In Sochi, he ended tenth in the sprint, and failed to score points. Due to financial reasons Zendeli left the team in early November and was replaced by Clément Novalak. Zendeli would finish 17th overall with 13 points, six places behind teammate Verschoor.

2022 
In 2022, Zendeli made a cameo deputisation at Spa-Francorchamps, replacing the banned Olli Caldwell at Campos Racing, which was his first F2 round since he left MP Motorsport in 2021. He finished the sprint race in 20th and retired from the feature race, with Caldwell returning for the next round at Circuit Zandvoort. His P20 finish meant Zendeli was classified 29th, last in the standings.

Super Formula 
At the end of 2022, Zendeli partook in a Super Formula test with B-Max Racing.

USF Pro 2000 Championship 
Zendeli returned to racing in 2023, racing in the 2023 USF Pro 2000 Championship with TJ Speed Motorsports.

Personal life 
His father Jauni, who had fled from North Macedonia before settling in Germany, founded a drywall works company in Bochum.

Karting record

Karting career summary

Racing record

Racing career summary 

† As Zendeli had not competed in the required number of rounds he was ineligible for a championship position.
‡ As Zendeli was a guest driver, he was ineligible to score points.
* Season still in progress.

Complete ADAC Formula 4 Championship results 
(key) (Races in bold indicate pole position) (Races in italics indicate fastest lap)

Complete Italian F4 Championship results 
(key) (Races in bold indicate pole position) (Races in italics indicate fastest lap)

† Zendeli did not compete in the required number of rounds to be eligible for a championship position.

Complete FIA Formula 3 Championship results 
(key) (Races in bold indicate pole position; races in italics indicate points for the fastest lap of top ten finishers)

† Driver did not finish the race but was classified as he completed over 90% of the race distance.
‡ Half points awarded as less than 75% of race distance was completed.

Complete Formula Regional European Championship results 
(key) (Races in bold indicate pole position; races in italics indicate fastest lap)

Complete Toyota Racing Series results 
(key) (Races in bold indicate pole position) (Races in italics indicate fastest lap)

Complete FIA Formula 2 Championship results 
(key) (Races in bold indicate pole position) (Races in italics indicate points for the fastest lap of top ten finishers)

American open-wheel racing results

USF Pro 2000 Championship 
(key) (Races in bold indicate pole position) (Races in italics indicate fastest lap) (Races with * indicate most race laps led)

*Season still in progress.

References

External links 
 

German racing drivers
German people of Albanian descent
1999 births
Living people
ADAC Formula 4 drivers
ADAC Formula 4 champions
FIA Formula 3 Championship drivers
Formula Regional European Championship drivers
FIA Formula 2 Championship drivers
Sportspeople from Bochum
Mücke Motorsport drivers
US Racing drivers
Charouz Racing System drivers
Trident Racing drivers
MP Motorsport drivers
Italian F4 Championship drivers
Toyota Racing Series drivers
Karting World Championship drivers
Campos Racing drivers
Sauber Motorsport drivers
German people of Macedonian descent
Albanian sportspeople